Sierra Aylina McClain (born March 16, 1994) is an American actress and singer. As an actress, she was first recognized for her role as Sierra in Daddy's Little Girls (2007). She had her breakthrough as Nessa Parker in Empire (2016–2018), and is also best known for starring as Tanya Clifton in the television series Mindhunter (2019). Her film roles have included starring as Tosha in the films Honey: Rise Up and Dance (2018), and as Carina in Shrink (2009). She is currently starring as Grace Ryder in 9-1-1: Lone Star (2020–present).

As a singer, she is best known as a member of the sister brother group Thriii with her sisters.

Early life 
Sierra Aylina McClain was born on March 16, 1994, in Decatur, Georgia. Her father, Michael McClain, is a music producer who produced Solange Knowles' debut album Solo Star (2002). Her mother, Shontell, is a songwriter and former screenwriter. She has two younger sisters, Lauryn and China Anne, who are also actresses and singers, and has a younger brother, Gabriel.

Career

2005–2010: Daddy's Little Girls and 3mcclaingirls 
After her sister was discovered in 2004 by a music executive who heard her sing, China was cast in the film The Gospel (2005) with Sierra cast in the children's choir. Around this time the sisters formed the music group the 3mcclaingirls. In December 2005, while on the set of Tyler Perry's House of Payne, China introduced her sisters Sierra and Lauryn to a show producer and the sisters performed a song for him. They were then cast in the film Daddy's Little Girls (2007) as the James sisters, and Sierra guest starred in the series, Tyler Perry's House of Payne. In 2008  the three sisters began posting videos on their YouTube channel of themselves singing covers of songs. McClain had a small role as a neighbor in the short film Six Blocks Wide (2008). The next year, she starred as Carina in the film Shrink alongside Kevin Spacey and Keke Palmer.

2011–2014: McClain Sisters and A.N.T. Farm 

After China landed her own show on the Disney Channel called A.N.T. Farm in 2011, McClain and her sisters changed their group name to the McClain Sisters, and sang two songs on the A.N.T. Farm soundtrack: "Perfect Mistake" and "Electronic Apology". Sierra McClain was also a theme music composer for the series. In December the group performed their version of the song "Jingle Bell Rock" at the 2011 Disney Parks Christmas Day Parade. In March 2012, the group signed with Hollywood Records, released their song "Rise", and was the opening act in Houston at the Houston Rodeo for Big Time Rush on their Better with U Tour.

The next month they performed at the 2012 White House Easter Egg Roll. In November 2012, McClain guest starred with her sister Lauryn and performed the song "Go" during the episode "chANTs of a Lifetime" for A.N.T. Farm. From late 2012 to 2016, McClain and her sisters continued performing and releasing songs. Most notably they released their song "The Great Divide" which peaked at number 4 on Billboard's US Kid Digital Songs; performed at the pre-show for the 2014 Radio Disney Music Awards and presented an award; and had their first headlining concert at the House of Blues in Anaheim, California; and performed at 19th Arthur Ashe Kids' Day. From the summer to the fall of 2014, the group embarked on a state fair tour around the United States. In December 2013, China announced on Twitter that A.N.T. Farm would be ending after its third season. Shortly after this announcement, the McClain Sisters parted ways with Hollywood Records. After leaving the record label, the group changed their name from the McClain Sisters to simply McClain.

2015–present: Empire and 9-1-1: Lone Star 
In September 2015, McClain was cast in a Showtime pilot by Lena Waithe, but it was not picked up. In 2016, McClain was cast and began starring as Nessa Parker, a recurring role, in the television series Empire (2016–2018). For the series, she sang several songs for the series' soundtrack, and her role as Nessa is considered her breakthrough role. Her girl group, McClain, went on hiatus after all three sisters booked various acting roles. She next went on to star as Tosha in the dance film Honey: Rise Up and Dance (2018). She gained further recognition for starring as main role Tanya Clifton in the second season of the critically acclaimed television series Mindhunter (2019). She gained more attention after starring as main role Grace Ryder in 9-1-1: Lone Star (2020–present).  

In June 2020, her girl group changed their name to Thriii, and performed at Radio Disney Presents ARDYs Summer Playlist.

Personal life 
She is a Christian and resides in Atlanta, Georgia, with her family.

Filmography

Film

Television

References

External links
 
 Sierra McClain on Instagram
 Sierra McClain on Twitter

1994 births
Living people
21st-century American actresses
African-American women singers
American child singers
Child pop musicians
Hollywood Records artists
African-American Christians
Musicians from Atlanta
Walt Disney Records artists
African-American actresses
American film actresses
American child actresses
African-American child actresses
21st-century American women singers
American television actresses
Actresses from Georgia (U.S. state)
Actresses from Atlanta
American pop musicians
American women pop singers
21st-century American singers